James Montgomery Campbell (1859-1937) was a Scottish clergyman who served as Moderator of the General Assembly of the Church of Scotland in 1928.

Origins 
Campbell's father, Rev George Campbell (1827-1904), was the parish minister of Eastwood, Glasgow, and his grandfather, Rev James Campbell (1789-1861), had been the established church minister of Traquair, Peeblesshire.

Education 
After leaving the local parish school, Campbell attended the Church of Scotland Normal School in the Cowcaddens, Glasgow, before proceeding to Arts and Divinity courses at the city's university. There followed practical training as a so-called student missionary at Lochinver in Assynt parish, Sutherland, then an assistant post at St Clement's, Dundee.

Career and later life
J Montgomery Campbell was ordained as a minister to Wallacetown, Dundee, in 1883. In 1905, he was admitted to St Michael's, Dumfries, where he remained until his retirement in 1930.

Throughout his career, Campbell was a very active public figure, functioning, inter alia, as chairman of the Dumfries and Galloway Royal Infirmary and president of the region's Fine Arts Society as well as in several committees. In 1928, he became an honorary burgess of Dumfries. Apart from holding several chaplaincies, he was a freemason of the Grand Lodge of Scotland.

He was married to Agnes, the daughter of Glasgow lawyer John Guy, who predeceased him in 1935. Very Rev Montgomery Campbell died without issue at Edinburgh on 13 February 1937.

References

See also 

 General Assembly of the Church of Scotland
 List of Moderators of the General Assembly of the Church of Scotland

1859 births
1937 deaths
19th-century Ministers of the Church of Scotland
20th-century Ministers of the Church of Scotland
Moderators of the General Assembly of the Church of Scotland